Sălcuţa may refer to places in:

Moldova
Sălcuţa, Căuşeni, a commune in Căuşeni district

Romania
Sălcuța, Dolj, a commune in Dolj County
 Sălcuţa, a village in Sânmihaiu de Câmpie Commune, Bistriţa-Năsăud County
 Sălcuţa, a village administered by Titu town, Dâmboviţa County
 Sălcuţa, a village in Calopăr Commune, Dolj County

See also 
Salcia (disambiguation)
Sălcioara (disambiguation)